Holton is a surname. Notable people with the surname include:

 Brian Holton, professional baseball player
 Cliff Holton, English footballer
 David Holton, professor of Modern Greek
 DeShaun Holton (1973-2006), musician/rapper
 Edward D. Holton, American politician and businessman
 Gary Holton, actor and musician
 Gary Holton (linguist), American linguist
 Gerald Holton, professor of physics
 Hart Benton Holton, American politician
 Henry Dwight Holton, American physician and Vermont legislator
 Jim Holton, football player
 Linwood Holton (1923–2021), Governor of Virginia
 Luther Hamilton Holton, politician and businessman
 Michael Holton (born 1961), American basketball player and coach
 Mark Holton, actor
 Pat Holton, football player
Richard Holton, British philosopher
Richard H. Holton (1926-2005), American economist
 Robert A. Holton, chemist
 Tyler Holton, American baseball player
 Woody Holton, professor of History

See also
Houlton (disambiguation)